Jet is a town in Alfalfa County, Oklahoma, United States. The population was 213 at the 2010 census.

History
The community of Jet was founded by the Jett brothers, six unmarried brothers named Joseph, Trigg, Newt, Warner, John, and Richard Jett, who established homesteads in the former Cherokee Outlet, shortly after its opening to settlement by non-Indians. The brothers erected buildings and opened a general store on Richard's land. The Jet post office was established in 1894, when it was moved from nearby Barrel Springs which was about 1.5 miles northeast .  Warner Jett as the first postmaster. The community grew into a small town, and Jet incorporated in 1900.

By August, 1907, the town had Baptist, Mennonite, Methodist, and Presbyterian churches in addition to seven general stores, two banks, two hotels, two grain elevators, plus a small school under construction. At the time of statehood in 1907, Jet had a population of 213 people.

Geography

Jet is located at the intersection of U.S. Highway 64 and State Highway 38. This intersection is the southern terminus of SH-38.

Climate

Demographics

As of the census of 2000, there were 230 people, 115 households, and 71 families residing in the town. There were 149 housing units at an average density of 483.5 per square mile (185.6/km2). The racial makeup of the town was 96.09% White, 1.30% Native American, 0.43% Asian, and 2.17% from two or more races. Hispanic or Latino of any race were 0.43% of the population.

There were 115 households, out of which 18.3% had children under the age of 18 living with them, 55.7% were married couples living together, 4.3% had a female householder with no husband present, and 37.4% were non-families. 35.7% of all households were made up of individuals, and 24.3% had someone living alone who was 65 years of age or older. The average household size was 2.00 and the average family size was 2.57.

In the town, the population was spread out, with 16.5% under the age of 18, 3.0% from 18 to 24, 24.3% from 25 to 44, 26.1% from 45 to 64, and 30.0% who were 65 years of age or older. The median age was 50 years. For every 100 females, there were 96.6 males. For every 100 females age 18 and over, there were 95.9 males.

The median income for a household in the town was $28,393, and the median income for a family was $31,250. Males had a median income of $25,000 versus $18,250 for females. The per capita income for the town was $15,024. About 2.7% of families and 5.3% of the population were below the poverty line, including none of those under the age of 18 and 9.0% of those 65 or over.

Education
Jet-Nash High School served Jet up until 2013, when the school folded due to a lack of sufficient funds. Jet is currently a part of Timberlake Regional School District, which also serves the towns of Nash, Nescatunga, Goltry, and Helena. The elementary school is located in Jet in the building that used to be Jet-Nash High School, and the high school, Timberlake High School, is located in Helena, about 13 miles south of Jet.

Economy
Jet's economy has been based on farming since its inception. The main products are wheat, livestock, and poultry. 

Tourism has bolstered the economy since the Great Salt Plains National Wildlife Refuge was established in 1930.  Jet is also the closest town to Great Salt Plains Lake and Great Salt Plains State Park just to the northwest.

References

External links
 Encyclopedia of Oklahoma History and Culture - Jet

Towns in Alfalfa County, Oklahoma
Towns in Oklahoma
Populated places established in 1894